The 48th District of the Iowa Senate is located in eastern Iowa, and is currently composed of Buchanan, Delaware, Jones, and Linn Counties.

Current elected officials
Dan Zumbach is the senator currently representing the 48th District.

The area of the 48th District contains two Iowa House of Representatives districts:
The 95th District (represented by Charlie McClintock)
The 96th District (represented by Lee Hein)

The district is also located in Iowa's 1st congressional district, which is represented by Ashley Hinson.

Past senators
The district has previously been represented by:

Jack Kibbie, 1965–1966
H. Kenneth Nurse, 1967–1968
Marvin W. Smith, 1969–1970
Quentin V. Anderson, 1971–1972
James E. Briles, 1973–1982
Charles W. Hutchins, 1983–1992
H. Kay Hedge, 1993–2000
Sandy Greiner, 2001–2002
Jeff Angelo, 2003–2008
Kim Reynolds, 2009–2010
Joni Ernst, 2011–2012
Dan Zumbach, 2013–present

References

48